Synchronization is the coordination of events to operate a system in unison.

Synchronization may also refer to:
 Synchronization (alternating current), the process of matching the speed and frequency of a generator or other source to a running network
 Synchronization (computer science), the synchronization of processes and data
 Synchronization (Nazi Germany) or Gleichschaltung, the process by which the Nazi Party established control over all aspects of German society 
 Synchronization rights, also called "sync licensing", to provide copyright permission for music to be used in video, videogames, or other AV works

See also
 Sync (disambiguation)
 Synchronization in telecommunications